Enzo Gabriel Coacci (born 9 August 1998) is an Argentine professional footballer who plays as a winger or midfielder for Estudiantes de Río Cuarto, on loan from Defensa y Justicia.

Career
Coacci's career got underway with Olimpo of Primera B Nacional. The 2018–19 season saw the midfielder join the club's first-team, with Coacci initially being an unused substitute for a Copa Argentina match against Aldosivi on 20 July. Nine days later, in the round of thirty-two, Coacci featured for twenty-eight minutes of a 1–0 defeat to Gimnasia y Esgrima. His league debut arrived in the following November in a loss to Platense.

After a loan spell at Estudiantes de Buenos Aires in 2021, Coacci joined Chacarita Juniors in February 2022 on a loan deal until the end of the year. The spell was terminated before time and Coacci was instead loaned out to Estudiantes de Río Cuarto in June 2022 until the end of the year.

Career statistics
.

References

External links

1998 births
Living people
Sportspeople from Bahía Blanca
Argentine footballers
Association football wingers
Association football midfielders
Primera Nacional players
Argentine Primera División players
Olimpo footballers
Defensa y Justicia footballers
Estudiantes de Buenos Aires footballers
Chacarita Juniors footballers
Estudiantes de Río Cuarto footballers